The Tanzania Girl Guides Association is the national Guiding organization of Tanzania. It serves 17,233 members (as of 2003). The first Guide Company was founded in Tanganyika in 1928, and the girls-only organization became a full member of the World Association of Girl Guides and Girl Scouts in 1963.

See also 
Tanzania Scouts Association

References 

 World Association of Girl Guides and Girl Scouts, World Bureau (2002), Trefoil Round the World. Eleventh Edition 1997. 

Tanzania Girl Guides Association
Tanzania Girl Guides Association

Youth organizations established in 1928